Kim Clijsters was the defending champion, but chose not to participate that year.

Maria Sharapova won in the final against Elena Dementieva.

Seeds
All seeds received a bye into the second round.

Draw

Finals

Top half

Section 1

Section 2

Section 3

Section 4

Bottom half

Section 5

Section 6

Section 7

Section 8

Qualifying

Seeds

Qualifiers

Lucky loser
  Maria Elena Camerin

Qualifying draw

First qualifier

Second qualifier

Third qualifier

Fourth qualifier

Fifth qualifier

Sixth qualifier

Seventh qualifier

Eighth qualifier

Ninth qualifier

Tenth qualifier

Eleventh qualifier

Twelfth qualifier

References

External links
 ITF results archive
 WTA results archive

Pacific Life Open - Women's Singles
Women's Singles